Eos Counsell (born 27 January 1976), also known as Eos or previously Eos Chater, is the second violinist of the all-female classical crossover string quartet Bond.

Counsell has an honours degree from the Royal College of Music in London and is from Cardiff, Wales.

Before Bond, her work included writing string arrangements and playing with many pop groups including The Divine Comedy, Cocteau Twins, Julian Cope, Gabrielle and Mark Knopfler.

Eos Counsell coached Benedict Cumberbatch for all the BBC Sherlock episodes that featured the violin, and recorded the sound.

She also coached Tom Hiddleston for Only Lovers Left Alive.

Eos Counsell, along with the other members of Bond quartet, received the Freedom of the City of London on 8 January 2018.

References

External links 
 Bond Official Website
 

Welsh violinists
1976 births
Living people
Alumni of the Royal College of Music
Bond (band) members
21st-century violinists